Delicacy is a 2011 French romantic comedy-drama directed by David and Stéphane Foenkinos based on a novel of the same name by David Foenkinos.

Plot
Nathalie, a young attractive woman is in love with a young attractive man, François. He proposes and they marry (portrayed in something resembling a ‘dream’ sequence), honeymoon, and are immediately pressured by family to have children. Nathalie takes a new job, hired partially because her new boss is sexually interested in her. One day, François goes out to jog and is killed in a traffic accident. Nathalie is devastated.

After wallowing in pity from the tragedy for several days, she collects most of François' stuff (reminders of him) in their apartment and tosses it into the garbage. Her friends and family are very concerned about her. She eventually returns to work, exciting her (married) boss as to her new ‘availability’. Time passes. On the job for three years and focusing solely on her work, she has gone without any other romantic relationship. One evening her boss takes her to dinner to celebrate getting a big contract and he hits on her. She is not attracted to him, and tells him so, but that they can still respect each other and work together.

One day at work, Markus, a subordinate on her work-team (unseen until now) enters her office to discuss a case, and she, in a trance-like state, just walks up to him and passionately kisses him. He is pleasantly stunned, and later leaves work confident and happy, passing several beautiful women in the street as they (in his mind) ‘ogle’ him. That night, he thinks about what happened and tries to imagine what Nathalie is doing.

His confusion about this incident is because he is a native Swede (who has worked in France the past 15 years, with his parents living nearby), balding, an average looking guy, maybe 40 years old, and cannot possibly imagine why someone like Nathalie would be interested in someone like him.

The next day at work he asks Nathalie why she kissed him, and she seems to not remember. She tells him she must have been ‘elsewhere’ and to forget it. He tells her he cannot. She says her behavior was inappropriate and that she was daydreaming, and he leaves her office. She tells her friend about the exchange. The first thing her friend asks her is "Is he hot?"

The next day at 5 pm at work Markus goes to see Nathalie and kisses her; she is surprised, but then enjoys kissing him, as they embrace. He leaves, and she goes to find him. They talk and agree to go to dinner. They seem to connect well. Markus still cannot believe this is happening.

They go to a play together a few nights later.  As he walks her home, he realizes he is falling in love, and tells her that, and that it's "ridiculous" and he doesn't want to get hurt, then runs away, leaving Nathalie puzzled.

The next day at work Markus purposely ignores her, to her annoyance. Nathalie lets slip to her assistant that they went to see that play, and office gossip about them being a ‘couple’ soon spreads. Nathalie goes to find Markus and tells him she enjoyed being together, but he still ignores her. Later that day, at an office birthday party for the assistant, Nathalie confronts Markus about his attitude in front of everyone, leading to further gossip. They reconcile, and he gives her a particularly sentimental gift. Later, Nathalie goes home to her father and cries.

Nathalie and Markus go on another date, where a guy openly hits on Nathalie, not believing she would be with a guy like Markus, and Markus and he fight. The next day at work, her boss asks about her new relationship, hinting at his disapproval, and infuriating her. The boss then calls Markus into his office to talk to him; they later have dinner, so the boss can figure out what Nathalie sees in Markus, discovering he is just a nice guy and a ‘poetic’ thinker. Markus puts the drunken boss into a cab, then goes to meet up with Nathalie at her friend's home, where there is a small party occurring. Nathalie is happy to see him and to introduce him to her 'crowd', but they, all ‘attractive people’, cannot see what she sees in him, either. Markus is very uncomfortable at this, and Nathalie senses that, so they leave and go home to her place, where they just fall asleep in separate chairs, holding hands.  At breakfast they talk about the "relationship" they are not having, which everyone else thinks they are in, and her annoying boss.

At work she confronts her boss about his meeting with Markus. Her boss calls Markus an "ugly, insignificant guy", and she tells him off. After further insulting words are put forth, including a comment about her ‘unfaithfulness’ to her deceased husband, Nathalie walks out, ignoring a major project meeting. She drives to the countryside where she grew up and where François was from too, even though they did not know each other then. Nathalie phones and then picks up Markus in a small town, and takes him to the cemetery where François is buried, but it is locked. Then, in the pouring rain, she takes him to her grandmother's home, where they are both warmly welcomed, and her grandmother is impressed by Markus, as she tells Nathalie, "He is a good man."

That night, after a simple soup dinner, they consummate their relationship. The next morning in the garden, as Markus plays hide-and-seek with Nathalie, he imagines her in various phases of her life in that garden, and hides amongst the many ‘hers’. Nathalie, counting, looks contented, enigmatically and wryly smiling into the camera.

Cast
 Audrey Tautou - Nathalie Kerr
 François Damiens - Markus Lundell
 Ariane Ascaride - Nathalie's Mother
 Joséphine de Meaux - Sophie, Nathalie's friend 
 Bruno Todeschini - Charles, Nathalie's boss
 Mélanie Bernier - Chloé, Nathalie's assistant 
 Audrey Fleurot - Ingrid
 Pio Marmaï - François
 Monique Chaumette - Madeleine, grandmother
 Pom Klementieff - The waitress

Production
Émilie Simon provided much of the original music for the film, and she has a 'flash cameo' just before 1:19 into the film.

Critical response
On review aggregator website Rotten Tomatoes, Delicacy has an approval rating of 62%, based on 71 reviews, with an average rating of 6/10. On Metacritic, which assigns a normalized rating, the film has a score of 53 out of 100, based on 21 critics, indicating "mixed or average reviews".

Accolades

References

External links
 

2010s French-language films
2011 romantic comedy-drama films
2011 films
Films about death
French romantic comedy-drama films
Films based on French novels
2011 comedy films
2011 drama films
2010s French films